Rose Hill in Longley Lane, Northenden, Manchester, England, is a 19th-century Victorian villa. It is most notable as the home of Sir Edward Watkin, "railway king and cross-channel visionary",  and in the late 20th century it was in use as a children’s home.

The house was designated a Grade II* listed building on 11 April 1991.

History

Rose Hill was bought by a wealthy cotton merchant, Absalom Watkin (1787–1861), in 1832. Watkin was a social and political reformer, an anti corn law campaigner and a diarist, recording life in early Victorian Manchester.

The house was inherited by Absalom's son, Edward Watkin. Edward was a noted transport entrepreneur who made his fortune as the managing director of nine separate railway companies at a time of vast expansion of the railways in mid-Victorian Britain. He was responsible for driving the expansion of the Metropolitan Railway into the rural areas outside London, and he also founded the Channel Tunnel Company in 1875, which undertook the first large-scale attempt to link England and France. He began construction of "The Great Tower of London", a larger version of the Eiffel Tower on the site of the current Wembley Stadium, but this was abandoned after a height of 155 feet had been reached.

In the 20th century, Rose Hill ceased to be a private dwelling. In 1915 it was purchased by the Manchester Poor Law Union to be used as a residential school for children suffering from ophthalmia. It was later used as a children's convalescent home and a nursery school, until it was taken over in 1955 by Manchester Corporation to be used as a children's home and juvenile remand home. The child care facility closed in the 1990s and was later the subject of a wide-ranging investigation into child abuse in Manchester's care homes from the 1960s to the 1980s.

In 1979 a major landscape painting by the American artist Frederick Edwin Church was discovered at Rose Hill. The Icebergs had been bought by Sir Edward in the 1860s and, following his death, was subsequently forgotten.

Rose Hill was converted into flats in 2003 and most of the grounds built-over with private housing.

Architecture
Rose Hill was built in the mid-19th century on a courtyard plan. The main entrance door has a large fanlight and is topped with a broken pediment supported by Tuscan columns.

Absalom Watkin extended the house in the late 19th century with "a single storey loggia of the finest ashlar with Doric order pilasters ... toy battlements appear elsewhere.  The interiors are especially fine." The house has spectacular stained glass: "The windows and doors all have very fine and imaginative art nouveau stained glass, with rose trees, birds and other flowers and plants and employing clear glass as part of the design."

See also

Grade II* listed buildings in Greater Manchester
Listed buildings in Manchester-M22

Notes

References

External links

Grade II* listed buildings in Manchester
Houses in Manchester
Child welfare in England